Prosenoides is a genus of bristle flies in the family Tachinidae. There are at least three described species in Prosenoides.

Species
Prosenoides assimilis Reinhard, 1954
Prosenoides curvirostris (Bigot, 1889)
Prosenoides cytorus (Walker, 1849)
Prosenoides diacrita Reinhard, 1954
Prosenoides dispar (Villeneuve, 1938)
Prosenoides flavipes Coquillett, 1895
Prosenoides grandis Reinhard, 1954
Prosenoides haustellata (Townsend, 1927)
Prosenoides isodomos Reinhard, 1954
Prosenoides longilingua (Villeneuve, 1943)
Prosenoides tenuipes (van Emden, 1947)
Prosenoides trilineata Reinhard, 1954

References

Dexiinae
Diptera of Africa
Diptera of North America
Diptera of South America
Taxa named by Friedrich Moritz Brauer
Taxa named by Julius von Bergenstamm
Tachinidae genera